Pandi Oliperukki Nilayam is a 2012 Indian Tamil-language romantic comedy film written and directed by Rasu Madhuravan. The film stars Shabarish and Sunaina.

Cast

 Sabarish as Pandi
 Sunaina as Valarmathi
 Soori as Soori
 Thambi Ramaiah as Food stall Owner
 Singampuli as Pandi's brother and micset company's shareholder
 Karunas as Amarkalam, Pandi's Rival
 Vatsan Chakravarthy  as Siluva
 Raj Kapoor as Pandi's father 
 K. Selva Bharathy
 Vaiyapuri as Neighbour 
 King Kong as Amarkalam's assistant 
 Ambani Shankar as shop owner 
 Veerasamar as henchman
 Prabu as Paraman
 Devaraj
 Pandian
 Nagendran
 Madurai Market Muthu
 Pasumpon Suresh
 Periyasamy as Childhood Pandi
Bava Lakshmanan as Loan giver
Appu as Amarkalam Assistant's Brother

Production
The film was originally titled Mike Set Pandi, but later retitled Pandi Oli Perukki Nilayam. Shabarish, son of popular stunt choreographer FEFSI Vijayan, selected for the male lead. Singam Puli and Vatsan will be seen in important roles. Deva, Pandian, Veerasamar, Nagendran, Madurai Market Muthu and Pasumpon Suresh are selected for Sunaina's brothers role. Salman Khan's body double Prabhu plays the antagonist.

Soundtrack 
Songs are by  Kavi Periyathambi, who previously worked with Rasu Madhuravan for Muthukku Muthaaga.

Reception
A critic from The Times of India gave the film a rating of three out of five stars and wrote that "Although the movie is more than two-and-a-half-hours long, thanks to the comedy track it feels to be time well spent". Malathi Ranagarajan of The Hindu opined that "Somewhere through the making of PON, Rasu Madhuravan seems to have lost interest, and it shows". A critic from Behindwoods rated it 0.5/5 deeming it to be "an outdated romance-revenge". A critic from Maalaimalar gave the film a negative review.

References

External links

2012 films
2010s Tamil-language films
Films directed by Rasu Madhuravan
2012 drama films